Prettier Than Pink was an all-female Filipino pop rock group. The band went professional in 1991 with original members- Lei Bautista (lead vocalist), Annie Trillo (bass guitars), Gretchen Gregorio (keyboards), and Vanessa Garcia (drummer). Many music enthusiasts consider the group unique among girl groups because the members played their own instruments. Originally called Pretty and Pink, the band started playing 60's music at Rock Ma Jazz ( a bar owned by RJ Jacinto) and eventually played 80's music from the Gogo's, Bangles, B-52's, etc. at different bars such as Par Avion, Kalye, Fat Tuesdays, and Cosmo.

In 1995 a self-produced demo garnered interest from various record labels and the group changed its name to Prettier Than Pink. Neo Records (now VIVA Records) eventually signed them up. After five months, an eponymous debut album went Gold. The single "Cool Ka Lang," written and composed by the band's lead singer and founding member Lei Bautista, reached no. 1 on the OPM charts.

By 1997, Prettier Than Pink had undergone a line-up transformation, with Bautista remaining as the group's leader. Their second album, UnPink, took a less commercial turn; but the release received regional airplay with "Baby". In 1998, Lei Bautista was nominated for an Awit award for "Baby."

Bautista left for the U.S. shortly thereafter, reviving Prettier Than Pink in America as a new wave-styled group. In 2005, Prettier Than Pink started recording their U.S. debut for the Sutton Records label.

Members

Final line-up
Lei Bautista - lead vocals/guitar
Pamela Aquino - lead guitar
Melanie Cariker - bass
Amy Behrman - keyboards/vocals
Jasmin Guevara - drums

Former line-up
Gretchen Gregorio - keyboards
Anne Trillo - bass
Vanessa Garcia - drums
Rozylyn Torres - lead guitar

Discography
Prettier in Pink (1995, VIVA Records)
Un-Pink (1997, VIVA Records)
Chop Suey (2005, Sutton Records)

External links
Official Myspace

Filipino pop music groups
Filipino rock music groups
Musical groups established in 1991
Musical groups disestablished in 2016
Filipino girl groups